WGAA AM 1340, FM 106.1 is a radio station broadcasting a classic hits format, and has Cedartown, Georgia, United States, as its city of license.  The station is currently owned by Burgess Broadcasting Corporation. The station broadcasts a variety of classic hits from the 1960s, 1970s, and 1980s, plus WGAA is the home for Cedartown High School football, basketball, softball, and baseball, the Grapevine, the world- famous Trading Post, and The Big Double A Book Club Radio Show and Podcast.

History
The Lam Entertainment Company, which owned and operated numerous movie theaters throughout the south in the early 20th century, launched WGAA 1340 AM and the West Cinema Theater on the same day in 1941, just months before the Japanese attack on Pearl Harbor. The studios were located on West Avenue, in a second story next door to the West Theater. In the early 1950s, the station made the move to its current location on Lakeview Drive, north of Cedartown.

By the 1960s, the station had a simulcast on WGAA-FM, which is now WWPW FM 96.1 in nearby metro Atlanta.

As of August 2018, the station now simulcasts programming on its FM translator at 106.1 FM (W291DN).

Personnel
President/morning drive: Frank Burgess, Jr.
Station Manager/News Director: Andrew Carter
 Sports: Logan Maddox
Office Manager: Gail Conner
Ad Sales and Marketing/Big Double A Book Club Radio Show and Podcast Host: Anna Lundy Cook

References

External links
WGAA Radio website

GAA
Radio stations established in 1960